The second series of Românii au talent was broadcast on ProTV from 7 February 2012 to 11 May 2012. ProTV kept the same team, Smiley and Pavel Bartoș presenters, Andra, Mihai Petre and Andi Moisescu jurors. The season started with a bigger audience than the first. The first episode from auditions had a 21.8 rating, compared to 18 points for the similar episode of the first season.

The show was won by mentalist Cristian Gog, with robot-dancer Mihai Petraiche second and speed-cubbing Cristian Leana on the third place.

Auditions 
The auditions were extended to six cities. Constanţa, Timișoara, Bucharest and Cluj-Napoca were kept, and Iaşi and Craiova were added. The auditions took place between August and September 2011.

The first episode was broadcast on 17 February and it was again a big hit for ProTV. They decided to air seven auditions episodes, instead of six for the first season. Also, the number of contestants qualified for the semifinals was extended from 48 to 60. There were five semifinals, three acts from each semifinal qualified for the final, two voted via phone or sms and the third voted by the jurors.

Semi-finalists

Semi-finals summary 

The "Order" columns list the order of appearance each act made for every episode.

Semi-final 1 (6 April) 
Guest performers: Adrian Țuțu and Narcis Iustin Ianău

Semi-final 2 (13 April) 
Guest performers: Valentin Dinu

Semi-final 3 (20 April) 
Guest performers: Cosmin Agache and Natalia & Aliona Duminică

Semi-final 4 (27 April) 
Guest performers: Titanii Funky Fresh, Robo & Valentin Păun and Ștefan Stan

Semi-final 5 (4 May) 
Guest performers: Ballance

Final (11 May) 
Guest performers: Andra and Razy Gogonea

Ratings

References

External links
 Romanii au talent at protv.ro

Românii au talent
2012 Romanian television seasons